Brigadier Lewis Pugh Evans,  (3 January 1881 – 30 November 1962) was a British Army officer and a recipient of the Victoria Cross, the highest award for gallantry in the face of the enemy that can be awarded to British and Commonwealth forces.

Early years and family
Lewis Pugh Evans was born at Abermad Llanfarian to Sir Gruffydd Humphrey Pugh Evans (1840–1902), Advocate-General of Bengal and a member of the Viceroy's Council, and Lady Emilia Savi Pugh Evans (née Hills; 1849–1938). Lewis Pugh Evans was educated at Eton and entered the army after training at the Royal Military College, Sandhurst.

Lewis Pugh Evans married Margaret Dorothea Seagrave Vaughan-Pryse-Rice on 10 October 1918. They lived at Lovesgrove on the death of his elder brother in 1945.

Military career
Following a year at Sandhurst, Evans entered the British Army with a commission in the Black Watch as second lieutenant on 23 December 1899, and served with the 2nd battalion in the Second Boer War in South Africa. He took part in operations in the Orange Free State February to May 1900, including the battles of Poplar Grove, Driefontein and Vet River; operations in the Transvaal May–June 1900, including the actions around Johannesburg, the occupation of Pretoria and the battle of Diamond Hill; and the battle of Battle of Belfast (August 1900). After the end of the conventional war he served with his battalion in the Orange River Colony during the Boer guerrilla warfare until peace was declared in June 1902. Following the end of the war in South Africa he left Point Natal for British India on the SS Ionian in October 1902 with other officers and men of his battalion, which after arrival in Bombay was stationed in Sialkot in Umballa in Punjab. After service with his regiment in India, Evans returned to England and obtained a pilot's certificate.

First World War
When the First World War broke out in 1914 he was posted as an air observer with the Royal Flying Corps, but after a few months he returned to the Black Watch and in 1917 was appointed to command the 1st Battalion, Lincolnshire Regiment.

On 4 October 1917 near Zonnebeke, Belgium, Pugh was commanding his battalion when the following deed took place for which he was awarded the VC:

After recovering from his wounds he returned to duty with the 1st Battalion. On 9 April 1918 their lines came under attack in the Germans' Spring Offensive in a three-day battle. He was awarded for this a Bar to his Distinguished Service Order, the citation for which read:

At the end of hostilities in November 1918 he was commanding the 14th Infantry Brigade of the 32nd Division with temporary rank of Brigadier-General.

Awards
Evans was mentioned in despatches seven times and was awarded the Distinguished Service Order and Bar; the 1914 Star and Clasp; the British War Medal; the Victory Medal; the Order of Leopold (Belgium) and the Croix de Guerre. He was made a Companion of the Order of St Michael and St George in 1919, and a Companion of the Order of the Bath in 1938. Pugh was also invested as an Officer of the Venerable Order of the Hospital of St John of Jerusalem.

He also as a living recipient of the Victoria Cross received the King George V Silver Jubilee Medal (1935), King George VI Coronation Medal (1937), and Queen Elizabeth II Coronation Medal (1953).

His VC is on display in the Lord Ashcroft Gallery at the Imperial War Museum, London.

Retirement
In 1938 he retired from the army but returned to service in the Second World War as a Military Liaison Officer at the Headquarters of the Wales Region. He worked with the Special Operations Executive in India. He later achieved the rank of brigadier. Between October 1947 and January 1951 he was Honorary Colonel of the 16th Battalion, the Parachute Regiment.

Pugh Evans was Honorary Colonel of the Army Cadet Force in Ceredigion and was for 25 years President of the Aberystwyth Branch of the Royal British Legion.

He was a Churchwarden at Llanbadarn Fawr, where he now lies buried, and a Justice of the Peace on the local bench as well as Deputy Lieutenant for Cardiganshire and a Freeman of the borough of Aberystwyth. Evans was also invested as an Officer of the Venerable Order of the Hospital of St John of Jerusalem.

He died of a heart attack, aged eighty-one, at Paddington Station, London.

References

1881 births
1962 deaths
Burials in Wales
British World War I recipients of the Victoria Cross
Companions of the Order of St Michael and St George
Companions of the Order of the Bath
British Army brigadiers
Welsh military personnel
British Army personnel of World War I
British Army personnel of the Second Boer War
Black Watch officers
Graduates of the Royal Military College, Sandhurst
People educated at Eton College
Deputy Lieutenants of Cardiganshire
People from Aberystwyth

Recipients of the Croix de Guerre 1914–1918 (France)
Companions of the Distinguished Service Order
British Army recipients of the Victoria Cross
Welsh recipients of the Victoria Cross